Gboko is a town in the Benue State of North-central Nigeria.

Climate

References

External links

Location on a map of Nigeria

Local Government Areas in Benue State